Erich Srbek (4 June 1908 – 24 February 1973) was a Czech football player. He played for several clubs, including DFC Praha, Sparta Prague and Viktoria Žižkov.

He played 14 matches for the Czechoslovakia national team and was a participant at the 1934 FIFA World Cup.

Srbek later worked as a football coach.

External links
 Profile at CMFS
 

1908 births
1973 deaths
Czech footballers
Czechoslovak footballers
Czech football managers
Czechoslovak football managers
1934 FIFA World Cup players
AC Sparta Prague players
Czechoslovakia international footballers
AC Sparta Prague managers
Association football midfielders
People from the Kingdom of Bohemia
Footballers from Prague
DFC Prag players